Wilmot is an unincorporated community in Jackson County, North Carolina, United States. Wilmot is located along U.S. Route 74, West of Dillsboro and East of Whittier.

As the Western North Carolina Railroad constructed the Murphy Branch, Wilmot served as a whistle stop and a point of access to the railroad for area logging companies.

References

External links
USGS: Wilmot
Travel Western North Carolina: Wilmot, WCU Digital Collections

Unincorporated communities in Jackson County, North Carolina
Unincorporated communities in North Carolina
Communities of the Great Smoky Mountains